Stephanie Hutchins (born 6 October 1998) is an English cricketer who currently plays for Devon. She plays as a right-arm off break bowler. She previously played for Western Storm.

Early life
Hutchins was born on 6 October 1998, and her home town is Romford. She also works as a cricket coach.

Domestic career
Hutchins made her county debut in 2015, for Devon against Scotland. She achieved her best List A bowling figures in 2018, taking 4/35 against Surrey. She became captain of Devon for the 2021 season, and took 7 wickets in the 2021 Women's Twenty20 Cup, including taking her Twenty20 best bowling figures of 3/2 against Wiltshire. She took eight wickets in eight matches for the side in the 2022 Women's Twenty20 Cup.

In 2020, Hutchins played for Western Storm in the Rachael Heyhoe Flint Trophy. She appeared in four matches, taking three wickets at an average of 43.33. She appeared in two matches for Western Storm in 2021, and took 2/27 in her one Rachael Heyhoe Flint Trophy match, against Northern Diamonds.

References

External links

1998 births
Living people
Place of birth missing (living people)
Devon women cricketers
Western Storm cricketers